Millipede (stylized millipede in western releases and Milli-Pede in Japan) is a fixed shooter video game released in arcades by Atari, Inc. in 1982. The sequel to 1981's Centipede, it has more gameplay variety and a wider array of insects than the original. The objective is to score as many points as possible by destroying all segments of the millipede as it moves toward the bottom of the screen, as well as eliminating or avoiding other enemies. The game is played with a trackball and a single fire button which can be held down for rapid-fire.

Millipede was initially ported to the Atari 2600 and Atari 8-bit family, then later to the Atari ST and Nintendo Entertainment System.

Gameplay 

The player no longer takes the role of the "Bug Blaster" from Centipede, but instead takes the role of an elf called the "Archer". The object of the game is to destroy a millipede that advances downward from the top of the screen. The millipede travels horizontally until it either hits an obstacle or reaches the edge of the screen, after which it drops one row and reverses direction. Once it enters the player's gray maneuvering area, it stays there and extra heads appear at intervals until both they and the millipede are destroyed. Shooting a body segment splits the millipede in two, with the rear portion sprouting its own head. A collision with any enemy costs the player one life.

Differences from Centipede
 According to the game's arcade flyer and instruction manual, the game's storyline involves the player character, Archer, defending his mushroom forest from the onslaught of gigantic insect monsters using his magic arrows.
 The millipede moves faster and its head segment is more difficult to hit.
 Earwigs replace scorpions from Centipede, making mushrooms poisonous so that the millipede will charge straight to the bottom of the screen after touching them.
 Bees replace fleas from Centipede, leaving mushrooms in a vertical line and requiring two shots to destroy.
 Spiders behave the same way as in Centipede, moving in zig-zag pattern across the player area and eating mushrooms. Multiple spiders can appear at the same time on higher levels.
 Inchworms move horizontally across the screen and slow all enemies for a short period of time when hit.
 Ladybugs crawl around the player area for a while, then climb up and leave the screen, turning any mushrooms they touch into indestructible flowers. When hit, all mushrooms on the screen scroll down one row.
 Dragonflies drop mushrooms while zig-zagging down.
 Mosquitoes bounce off the sides of the screen as they descend diagonally. When hit, all mushrooms on the screen scroll up one row.
 DDT bombs are triggered when shot, destroying all enemies and mushrooms within the resulting cloud. Whenever the mushrooms scroll down, a new bomb is added at the top of the screen, with up to four bombs in play at one time. Points are scored for shooting the bomb itself, and enemies destroyed in the blast are worth three times the normal points.

All flowers and poisoned or partially destroyed mushrooms revert to normal, whole mushrooms and score points during the process when the player loses a life.

At regular intervals, the player enters a bonus level with a swarm of enemies (bees, dragonflies, etc.) instead of the usual millipede. Each enemy awards increasing points, up to a maximum of 1,000 points per enemy. The attack ends when either the entire swarm has passed or the player loses a life. Also, at intervals new mushrooms will grow on the field while others disappear, in a pattern similar to Conway's Game of Life.

Players can choose whether to play at an advanced level, starting with a score that is a multiple of the number of points needed to earn an extra life (by default, 15,000). The gameplay is generally much more advanced than it would be had the player started with a score of 0 and worked their way up to that point level. The maximum advanced level allowed is a function of the preceding player's score, and games started at an advanced level where the player did not earn at least one extra life are not eligible for the high scoreboard.

Ports 
Millipede was released for the Atari 2600 and Atari 8-bit family in 1984, with an Atari ST port following in 1986. A version for the Family Computer was developed and published by HAL Laboratory, known as Milli-Pede: Kyodai Konchū no Gyakushū, later renamed to Millipede: Super Arcade Hit! for its 1988 US NES release. In the Family Computer and NES versions, earwigs do not poison the mushrooms.

A port of the Atari 8-bit computer version to the Atari 5200 was completed in 1984 but not published.

Reception 
It was listed by Cash Box magazine as America's fourth highest-grossing arcade game of 1983, below Ms. Pac-Man, Pole Position and Dragon's Lair.

French magazine Tilt rated the arcade game with four out of six stars.

Legacy 
In 1995, Millipede was released together with Centipede on the Game Boy under the title Arcade Classic No. 2: Centipede / Millipede.

In 1997, it was included in Arcade's Greatest Hits: The Atari Collection 2 for the PlayStation.

In 2005, Millipede was combined with Super Breakout and Lunar Lander for the Game Boy Advance

The arcade and Atari 2600 versions of the game were rereleased in the 2005 Atari Anthology for the Xbox and PlayStation 2. Millipede and Centipede were made available for the Xbox 360 via Xbox Live Arcade in 2007.

High scores
Donald Hayes, of New Hampshire, USA, scored a world record 10,627,331 points playing Millipede on December 26, 2004.  The highest Millipede score played under tournament settings is 495,126 points, also by Hayes.

In the default high-scores table of the arcade, the initials "ED" and "FXL" refer to "Ed Logg" (designing and programming) and "Franz Lanzinger" (who helped a bit in designing and testing).

References

External links

 
 Millipede at the Arcade History database
 Millipede for the Atari 2600 at Atari Mania
 Millipede for the Atari ST at Atari Mania

1982 video games
Arcade video games
Atari games
Namco games
Atari 8-bit family games
Atari arcade games
Atari ST games
Cancelled Atari 7800 games
Atari 2600 games
Cancelled Atari 5200 games
Ed Logg games
Fixed shooters
Nintendo Entertainment System games
Trackball video games
Video games about insects
Video games developed in the United States
Video games scored by Brad Fuller
Xbox 360 Live Arcade games
Vertically-oriented video games
Multiplayer and single-player video games